Anuththara Madawa (born 3 April 1995) is a Sri Lankan cricketer. He made his first-class debut for Panadura Sports Club in the 2017–18 Premier League Tournament on 15 December 2017.

References

External links
 

1995 births
Living people
Sri Lankan cricketers
Panadura Sports Club cricketers
Place of birth missing (living people)